Oualid Tarik Mamoun (born April 3, 1996 in Mantes-la-Jolie) is a French-Algerian footballer who currently plays for FC Mantois 78.

In June 2016, Mamoun signed his first professional contract with Angers SCO.

In June 2018, Mamoun signed a two year contract with Algerian Ligue Professionnelle 1 club.

References

External links
 

1996 births
Algerian footballers
Algerian Ligue Professionnelle 1 players
French sportspeople of Algerian descent
MC Alger players
Angers SCO players
People from Mantes-la-Jolie
Association football midfielders
Living people
Footballers from Yvelines